Exoprosopa is a large cosmopolitan genus of flies belonging to the family Bombyliidae (bee-flies), with over 325 described species. The genus parasitizes a wide range of insects, including locust and larvae of wasps.

Description
This genus contains the largest bee flies, of about 14 mm, sometimes larger, up to 22 mm, though a few species are as small as 6 mm. The proboscis is short. The head is large and only loosely attached to the thorax. The antenna are small and well separated. Wings are large, with wingspan 40 mm, up to 64 mm in the largest species, nearly always boldly patterned; abdomen patterned (often banded) with white or pale scales on segment 6 and 7 or on each segment. Many species are sexually dimorphic.

Distribution
Species are found worldwide, however Southern Africa is especially species rich with over 135 species.

See also
 List of Exoprosopa species

References

Bombyliidae
Diptera of Europe
Diptera of Australasia
Diptera of Africa
Diptera of Asia
Diptera of North America
Diptera of South America
Brachycera genera
Taxa named by Pierre-Justin-Marie Macquart